, also known as Flat Broke Sisters, is a Japanese manga series written and illustrated by Izumi Kazuto. It was serialized in Shogakukan's seinen manga magazine Monthly Sunday Gene-X from April 2004 to October 2006, with its chapters collected in four tankōbon volumes. A ten-episode anime television series adaptation by Toei Animation was broadcast from June to September 2006.

Plot
Binbō Shimai Monogatari's plot revolves around two sisters, a junior high school student named Kyō and an elementary school student Asu, who live alone. Their mother died the same year she gave birth to Asu and a few years later, their father, faced with a large gambling debt, ran away, abandoning them. They work together to live their lives and go to school in spite of the difficulties they face, receiving help from the people around them from time to time.

Characters

Kyō is a 15 year-old junior high school student. She delivers newspapers to make money for their small family unit and has also taken up a job as a tutor. She is afraid of lightning, but does not let that stop her from taking good care of her younger sister. Kyō promised her deceased mother that she would take good care of Asu and is doing everything in her power to live up to that promise. Her name is a homonym, as kyō can be written  which means "today".

Asu is a 9 year-old elementary school student. She does the shopping for the family and also takes care of the cooking and cleaning. Asu is extremely fond of her big sister and tries to do everything she can to make life easier for her, since she is, as yet, too young to work and earn money herself. Asu is quite skilled; she has been chosen as her class representative and is frequently consulted by her classmates when they have trouble with their homework. She claims to be tone-deaf, but manages to sing after their neighbour, Masao, tutors. Curiously, she has a single memory of her mother, who died when Asu was still a baby; she remembers her mother, while she was still carrying Asu in her womb, asking Asu to take care of Kyō. Asu's name is also a homonym, written  it means "tomorrow".

Genzō, the owner of the apartment building where the sisters live, is an older man who rarely smiles and appears gruff and forbidding. He is, however, very much concerned with the sisters' welfare and was the only one willing to take them in when their father abandoned them. In his own way, he tries to look out for the Yamada sisters. They apparently remind him of his wife, Eriko, and daughter, Mami, who were killed in an accident. For all that he cares about the sisters (whom he treats like granddaughters), he still collects the full rent every month.

, 
, 
Kinko and Ginko are another pair of sisters in the story. Kinko (golden child) is the elder, Ginko (silver child) the younger. Ginko attends the same elementary school as Asu and is also her class representative, but is considerably less popular, since her personality is more domineering than Asu's. Kinko is a member of her school's student council and Ginko expects that she will have to live up to her older sister's example. These sisters are both blond-haired and belong to an extremely rich family, with all the advantages thereof. However, their relationship is much rockier than that enjoyed by Kyō and Asu, since they do not always understand each other as well as they should. Ginko initially feels that she is a constant disappointment to her older sister and that Kinko must dislike her; Kinko in turn thinks that Ginko hates her. Eventually a troubled Ginko manages to understand her sister a little better and patch their relationship somewhat thanks to advice from Asu and her covert observations of the Yamada sisters' homelife - through a telescope. At one time, the sisters kept a pet alligator named John in their garden, who had been visited with the indignity of a bow ribbon. Kinko has an obsession with acquiring bargains from shops and has charged Ginko with acquiring them after her school goes out. Since they are rich, Ginko is as baffled by this obsession as are the Yamada sisters.

The sisters' downstairs neighbour is a woman who constantly wears sunglasses and is apparently abysmally bad at housekeeping. It is unclear what kind of work she does, but she is apparently well-off, as could be seen when Kyō found a wallet Ranko had dropped. Asu is the only one to have seen Ranko without her sunglasses, which makes her seem somewhat suspicious. Asu claims the 'neighbour onee-san' looks like a nice person without them. When she learns of the sisters' situation, she warms up to them, even lending Kyō one of her suits and fixing her makeup when the elder sister wants to look a bit more mature for Asu's school's open house.

Masao is another of the Yamada sisters' neighbours at the apartment building. He is an aspiring singer who has to live off part-time jobs and is struggling to make his breakthrough. Masao already has a loyal following of fans, which supplies him with food. An encounter with Asu and her subsequent request for singing lessons so that she can pass a test at school, motivates him not to give up his dreams of becoming a singer.

Media

Manga

Binbō Shimai Monogatari, written and illustrated by Izumi Kazuto, was serialized in Shogakukan's seinen manga magazine Monthly Sunday Gene-X from April 19, 2004, to October 19, 2006. Shogakukan collected its chapters in four tankōbon volumes, released from August 12, 2005, to December 19, 2006.

Anime

Episode list
{| class="wikitable" style="width:99%;"
|-
! style="background:#f60;"| Ep no.
! style="background:#f60;"|Title 
!  style="background:#f60; width:15%;"| Original Airdate
|-

|}

Music

Opening theme
  by Splash Candy

Ending theme
  by Kanako Sakai

Notes

References

External links
 Toei Animation's Official Site 
 

2004 manga
Comedy anime and manga
Seinen manga
Shogakukan franchises
Shogakukan manga
Slice of life anime and manga
Toei Animation television
TV Asahi original programming